Jan Viktor Olsson (born 18 March 1944) is a Swedish former professional footballer who played as a midfielder. He represented GAIS, VfB Stuttgart, and Örgryte IS during a club career that spanned between 1965 and 1977. A full international between 1967 and 1973, he won 22 caps and scored one goal for the Sweden national team and played at the 1970 FIFA World Cup. He was awarded Guldbollen as Sweden's best footballer of the year in 1970.

Club career 
Olsson played for Gais before he became a professional with VfB Stuttgart in 1969. In 1971, he returned to Gais. He is remembered as a rough midfielder and defender.

International career 
In the 1970 FIFA World Cup Olsson marked the Italian forward Gigi Riva with tenacity and vigor. In total he was capped 22 times for the Sweden national team.

Post-playing career 
Olsson was the manager of Eintracht Braunschweig from July 1994 until September 1995.

Honours 
Individual

 Stor Grabb: 1969
 Guldbollen: 1970

References

External links

1944 births
Living people
People from Sotenäs Municipality
Sportspeople from Västra Götaland County
Swedish footballers
Association football midfielders
Sweden international footballers
1970 FIFA World Cup players
Bundesliga players
GAIS players
VfB Stuttgart players
Swedish football managers
Eintracht Braunschweig managers
Swedish expatriate footballers
Swedish expatriate sportspeople in Germany
Expatriate footballers in West Germany
Expatriate football managers in Germany
Swedish expatriate football managers
Swedish expatriate sportspeople in West Germany